Megasoma anubis is a species of beetles belonging to the family Scarabaeidae.

Description
These large and heavy beetles are black but they have a soft, velvety surface, as they are densely covered with a yellowish-grey dust. Males are much larger than females and have a medium length and curved horn on the head. On pronotum there is a short median horn. Females lack horns. The legs are relatively long with sharp claws.

These beetles are considered a pest.  The larvae live and develop in 1–2 years. They feed on the inflorescence of the Chinese fan palm (Livistona chinensis). Adults mainly feed on rotting fruits and can be found from January to April.

Distribution
This species has a Neotropical distribution (Brazil).

Gallery

References 

 Reitter, E. 1960. Beetles. G.P. Putnam's Sons, New York, NY.
 Castelnau F. (1840) Histoire Naturelle des Insectes Coléoptères. Avec une introduction renfermant L'Anatomie et la Physiologie des Animaux Articulés, par M.Brullé, P.Duménil. Paris 2:1-564
  Gory H.L. (1836) Tetralobus et Scarabaeus nouveaux, Annales de la Société Entomologique de France 5:513-515
  Chevrolat A. (1836) [Scarabaeus Anubis], Guérin-Méneville F.E. Magazine Zoologie Plates 139-140

Dynastinae
Arthropods of Brazil
Beetles described in 1836